McWhinnie Peak is a peak  northeast of Mount Harker in the Saint Johns Range, Victoria Land, Antarctica.

References

Mountains of Victoria Land
Scott Coast